The San Bernardino punk riot occurred on March 4, 2006, after a punk rock festival titled the British Invasion 2k6 in San Bernardino, California, United States was shut down early due to the stabbing of a concert-goer. The disturbance that led to the stabbing was reportedly caused by a group of skinheads shouting racist remarks towards concert-goers.

Rioting 

This took place after there was a skinhead fight outside between antiracist skinheads and neo-Nazi skinheads. One of the neo-Nazis who went back inside after the fight was still mad. As he kept raving about white power, people started arguing with him and throwing things at him. When a fight was about to break out and a crowd of people were going to beat him up, security separated him from the crowd and put him behind a small fence. The name calling and racist remarks from both sides kept going behind the fence. This is where there was enough tension and people to overpower security and the fence. The crowd of punks and skinheads rushed in and started beating him up; it was at that point when he was stabbed. The police, in an apparent attempt to disperse the agitated crowd, used tear gas, releasing it not only at the site of the disturbance but also inside the venue itself where no disturbance had occurred, catching many concert-goers unawares. Some attendees became angry and destroyed several police cars outside the venue. Helicopters and riot police were called in and the crowd moved out of the parking lot and into San Bernardino. There were people jumping up and down on police cars and breaking headlights with their steel-toe boots, and one police car was turned upside down. Estimates put the crowd at 1,500 fans who then began vandalizing local businesses and parked cars in the downtown area. Dumpsters were set on fire and several shops were broken into while dozens more were damaged. Many attendees who were driven to the event by parents were unable to disperse as demanded by the police and were subsequently forced into the surrounding neighborhoods.

Response 
Nearly 200 police were called in to quell the riot, which lasted several hours. At least four officers were injured and two concert-goers were hospitalized, one of them being the stabbing victim. The police made over a dozen arrests. The riot caused an estimated $500,000 in damages.

References

 In this video at 2:20 you can see a punk getting hit with a baton in the head
Riot Strikes at San Bernardino Punk Concert

2006 in music
2006 crimes in the United States
2006 riots
Punk
History of San Bernardino, California
March 2006 events in the United States